The 4th Lo Nuestro Awards ceremony, presented by Univision honoring the best Latin music of 1991 and 1992 took place on May 14, 1992, at a live presentation held at the Caesars Palace in Las Vegas, Nevada. The ceremony was broadcast in the United States and Latin America by Univision.

During the ceremony, nineteen categories were presented. Winners were announced at the live event and included Mexican singer-songwriter Ana Gabriel receiving four competitive awards. Dominican singer Juan Luis Guerra, Mexican group Pandora, and American band La Mafia earned two accolades each.

Background 
In 1989, the Lo Nuestro Awards were established by Univision, to recognize the most talented performers of Latin music. The nominees and winners were selected by a voting poll conducted among program directors of Spanish-language radio stations in the United States and also based on chart performance on Billboard Latin music charts, with the results being tabulated and certified by the accounting firm Deloitte. The award included a trophy shaped like a treble clef. The categories were for the Pop, Tropical/Salsa, Regional Mexican genres and Music Video fields, and for the first time a Rap field was also considered. The 4th Lo Nuestro Awards ceremony was held on May 14, 1992, in a live presentation held at the Caesars Palace in Las Vegas. The ceremony was broadcast in the United States and Latin America by Univision.

Winners and nominees 

Winners were announced before the live audience during the ceremony. Mexican singer-songwriter Ana Gabriel set a record for most wins ever in a single ceremony, receiving four awards: Pop and Regional Mexican Female Artist of the Year, Pop Song of the Year ("Cosas del Amor"), and Regional Mexican Album of the Year for Mi México.

Dominican band Juan Luis Guerra y 440 were awarded Tropical Salsa Album of the Year for Bachata Rosa, which also received a Grammy Award for Best Tropical Latin Album. Mexican group Pandora won two awards, for Pop Group and Pop Album of the Year for their Grammy-nominated set Con Amor Eterno. Mexican singer Daniela Romo earned the accolade for Video of the Year for her number-one single "Todo, Todo, Todo". Cuban-American singer-songwriter Gloria Estefan received the Lifetime Achievement Award.

See also
1991 in Latin music
1992 in Latin music
Grammy Award for Best Latin Pop Album

References

1992 music awards
Lo Nuestro Awards by year
1992 in Nevada
1992 in Latin music
20th century in Las Vegas
Caesars Palace